Adenophyllum cooperi (Cooper's dyssodia, Cooper's glandweed), is a  North American species of perennial flowering plants in the family Asteraceae. It is, native to the Mojave Desert in the southwestern United States, in the States of California, Arizona, Nevada, and Utah.

Description
Adenophyllum cooperi grows to 35–60 cm tall. The leaves are 6–20 cm long, obovate, with a lobed or coarsely toothed margin. The flowers are yellow to orange-red.

References

External links

Jepson Flora Project: Adenophyllum cooperi

North American desert flora
Flora of the Southwestern United States
Tageteae
Plants described in 1874